Cacostola flexicornis is a species of beetle in the family Cerambycidae. It was described by Henry Walter Bates in 1865. It is known from Venezuela, Brazil and French Guiana.

References

Cacostola
Beetles described in 1865